Melting Pot, also known as Race, is a 1998 feature film directed by Tom Musca, writer and producer of Stand and Deliver.

Premise
Gustavo Alvarez is a Latino house painter who resides in Los Angeles. His wife urges him to compete for a seat on the city council now that Councilman Jack Durman has retired from politics. Alvarez decides to run but soon realizes that it will not be an easy fight. His opponent, Lucinda Davis, is an experienced black politician who is eager to win. As the campaign intensifies, things get nasty, and a race war nearly erupts.

Cast

 Paul Rodriguez - Gustavo Alvarez
 CCH Pounder - Lucinda Davis
 Cliff Robertson - Jack Durman
 Una Damon - Chungmi Kong
 Annette Murphy - Reyna Álvarez
 Efren Ramirez - Miguel Álvarez
 Lillian Hurst - Grandma Álvarez
 Peter Krause - Pedro Marine
 Danielle Nicolet - Deuandranice
 Jude Herrera - Dolores
 Winston J. Rocha - Carlos
 Brian Poth - Walter Cahill Jr.
 Leticia Robles - Latina reporter
 Bruce Sabath - White cop
 John C. Mooney - Walter Cahill Sr.
 Paul Bartel - Moderator
 Luis Guizar - Iannicito

Reviews
It was reviewed with 2,5 stars in Chicago Tribune. Wrote Doug Pratt, "The jacket art tries to sell the film as a gang drama, but it is more of a seriously toned comedy. While exaggerations of the political process prevent it from being totally believable, it does offer insights and humor on a subject that is far less covered than it ought to be in popular entertainment. Best of all, the characters played by Pounder and Rodriguez are neither good nor bad, and the flaws in their characters, acerbated by the stress of the election, brings focus not only to their humanity, but to the realities of American civics".

References

External links
 

1998 films
1998 drama films
American drama films
1990s English-language films
1990s American films